Gillett Nunataks are two mainly snow-covered nunataks at the east end of Spitz Ridge and the Toney Mountain massif, Marie Byrd Land.  Mapped by United States Geological Survey (USGS) from surveys and U.S. Navy air photos, 1959–66.  Named by Advisory Committee on Antarctic Names (US-ACAN) for Richard D. Gillett, RM1, U.S. Navy, Radioman at South Pole Station, 1974.

References

Nunataks of Marie Byrd Land